Middle East Business Report is a monthly half-hour programme broadcast globally on BBC World News; covering business stories across the Middle East.

Presented by Nima Abu-Wardeh the programme was billed as

"Getting behind the issues of trade, business and economics, providing a window on finance and commerce in the Middle East, revealing how this important economic region works and interacts with the rest of the world." 
 
Middle East Business Report was shown on Fridays, Saturdays and Sundays.  The final broadcast of the programme was 28 March 2015.

Presenters

See also
Marketplace Middle East; similar programme produced by CNN International

References 

BBC World News shows